Houseplant is a cannabis company co-founded by Canadian-American actor and comedian Seth Rogen,  American-Canadian businessman Michael Mohr, and Canadian-American screenwriter Evan Goldberg.

History

Initially launched in Canada in 2019, Rogen announced the company's March 11 expansion into the United States starting in California via his Twitter account on March 1, 2021. The announcement was popular enough that Houseplant's United States website crashed due to an influx of traffic.

In January 2023, Houseplant partnered with Airbnb, to offer a 3 night stay at a weed-friendly house that included meeting Seth Rogan.

Description and products
Rogen looked at "hundreds" of cannabis strains before choosing three for the initial launch. The strains, Diablo Wind, Pink Moon and Pancake Ice, were named after weather systems in reference to the strains found in his 2008 film Pineapple Express. In addition, Houseplant also sells vinyl mixtapes that correspond to and are meant to be played while under the effects of the initial three-strain line. Houseplant's name is derived from the company's sale of both home goods, such as ash trays and ceramics, under the "Housegoods" name (house) and cannabis products (plant). According to Nerdist, Rogen has not mentioned the source of the cannabis, nor his professional relationship with the growers.

The company also sales various home accessories, such as elaborate ashtrays, table lighters, planters, turn tables and record collections.

References

Canadian companies established in 2019
American companies established in 2021
Health care companies established in 2019
Cannabis companies of Canada
Cannabis companies of the United States